

Indeterminate or unspecified dinosaur tracks

Ornithischians

Indeterminate or unspecified ornithischian tracks

Saurischians

Theropods

Sauropodomorphs

See also

List of dinosaur-bearing rock formations

Footnotes

References
 Weishampel, David B.; Dodson, Peter; and Osmólska, Halszka (eds.): The Dinosauria, 2nd, Berkeley: University of California Press. 861 pp. .

Tracks
Dinosaur trace fossils